ATV News was the newsgathering arm of ATV in Hong Kong. It provided news programmes to both its ATV Home and ATV World.

On April 11, 2011, ATV News unveiled its new title sequence, which was turned out to be a copy of a personal conception of BBC News title sequence published by Michael Wood on YouTube. Days later, they were forced to revert to the previous title as a result.

As a consequence of ATV's chronic financial difficulties, most newsgathering staff were laid off on 6 February 2016. ATV was ordered on 20 February 2016 to restore production of Cantonese news until the end of the period of its broadcast licence on 1 April 2016.

Current affairs
Besides producing daily news reports, ATV offered eight news programmes: Cantonese, Mandarin, English. Its news programmes broadcast in Cantonese were:
 Decoding Current Affairs (時事解碼)
 Following Ad Hoc News (時事熱點追蹤)
 Investment Strategy (窩輪有法) 
 Mr. Tsang's Show (曾sir28騷)

Its two English-language news programmes were ATV Newsline, a discussion show, and ATV Inside Story, a topical magazine show.

Notable staff

ATV World
 Claire Yiu
 Tim Bredbury

External links
 ATV News Home Page

Mass media in Hong Kong
Asia Television
Television channels and stations established in 1957
1957 establishments in Hong Kong